Johan Peter Molin (born 17 March 1814 in Gothenburg; died 29 July 1873 in Ekudden near Vaxholm) was a Swedish sculptor.

Life
Johan Peter Molins father was the baker Anders Molin, who lived in Gothenburg. In 1843, Molin travelled to Copenhagen to study with Herman Wilhelm Bissen. Later he lived in Paris and during eight years in Rome. From 1853 he taught at the Royal Swedish Academy of Fine Arts and two years later he was appointed professor in sculpting. In 1859 he completed the sculpture The Knife Wrestlers ("Bältespännarna"). Copies of this work exist in Gothenburg, in Stockholm and in other Swedish cities. His statue of Karl XII was unveiled in 1868 in Kungsträdgården in Stockholm, where also the Molin fountain is located. Some of his work was exhibited in London and Paris.

Molin won awards from the Order of Vasa, from the Order of the Polar Star, from the Order of St. Olav and from Pour le Mérite.

Works
Karl XII, bronze, 1868, located in Kungsträdgården in Stockholm
David med sin slunga, Marmor, Stockholm Palace, Stockholm
Fountain, bronze, Kungsträdgården in Stockholm
Fountain, bronze, Rådhusparken in Jönköping
Johan Anders Wadman, bronze bust, Göteborg
Bältesspännarna, bronze, in the park in front of the Swedish National Museum in Stockholm, in Bältesspännarparken in Gothenburg and in Mästarnas park in Hällefors

Some of his works are displayed at the Gothenburg Museum of Art, at Vänersborgs museum and at Kalmar konstmuseum, among other places

Gallery

Literature
Lindwall, Bo: Johan Peter Molin in Svenskt biografiskt lexikon (1985–1987) (Swedish language)

1814 births
1873 deaths
19th-century Swedish sculptors
People from Gothenburg